Cathedral Plaza is an illegal office building in Bucharest, Romania, close to the Saint Joseph Cathedral. It has 19 floors and a surface of 23,000 m2. At a height of 75 m (246 ft), the structure was finished in 2010, but the building was never opened because it lacks proper permits.

The building was deemed to be illegal and ordered to be demolished in 2011 by the Suceava Court of Appeals. The demolition order was issued in July 2022.

References

Skyscraper office buildings in Bucharest
Office buildings completed in 2010